The Aviation Industries of Iran AVA-202 is an Iranian two-seat, light aircraft designed as a trainer and sporting aircraft. It was intended for the Iranian domestic market to avoid dependence on imports.

Design and development
The AVA-202 was based on the Van's Aircraft RV-6A and was designed to comply with European JAR-22 and JAR-VLA aircraft certification rules. It features a cantilever low-wing, a two-seats-in-side-by-side configuration enclosed cockpit under a bubble canopy, fixed tricycle landing gear and a single engine in tractor configuration.

The aircraft is made from aluminum sheet. Its  span wing employs a NACA 63-215 airfoil at the wing root and a NACA 63-015 airfoil at the wing tip. The standard engine fitted is the  Lycoming AEIO-320-B2B  four-stroke aerobatic powerplant.

Specifications

See also
Iran Aviation Industries Organization

References

 Jackson, Paul. Jane's All The World's Aircraft 2003–2004. Coulsdon, UK: Jane's Information Group, 2003. .

1990s Iranian civil utility aircraft
Low-wing aircraft
Aircraft first flown in 1997